James Moulton may refer to:

James Egan Moulton (1841–1909), English-born Australian Methodist minister and headmaster
James Hope Moulton (1863–1917), British non-conformist divine